Edgardo Norberto Andrada (2 January 1939 – 4 September 2019)  was an Argentine footballer who played as a goalkeeper for several top level Argentine and Brazilian clubs.

Career
Born in Rosario, Santa Fe province, Edgardo Andrada initially tried a career as a basketball player, then, when he was 19 years old, he unsuccessfully tried to work as San Lorenzo's goalkeeper, eventually  joining Rosario Central, of his home city Rosario, where he started his professional career in 1960, staying in the club until 1969, playing 283 matches. In 1969, he moved to Vasco, of Brazil, leaving the club in 1975.

On 19 November 1969, at Estádio do Maracanã, Edgardo Andrada suffered Pelé's 1000th goal, scored from a penalty kick. While playing for Vasco, he won the Campeonato Carioca in 1970, Placar's Campeonato Brasileiro Série A Bola de Prata award in 1971, and the Campeonato Brasileiro Série A in 1974. In 1976, he played for Vitória, returning to Argentina in 1977, where he played 122 matches for Colón between that year and 1982, and 16 matches for Renato Cesarini in 1982, when he retired.

National team
Edgardo Andrada was Argentina's goalkeeper during the 1963 South American Championship, held in Bolivia.

References

1939 births
2019 deaths
Argentine footballers
Argentine expatriate footballers
Rosario Central footballers
CR Vasco da Gama players
Esporte Clube Vitória players
Club Atlético Colón footballers
Argentina international footballers
Expatriate footballers in Brazil
Argentine expatriate sportspeople in Brazil
Argentine people of Portuguese descent
Association football goalkeepers
Footballers from Rosario, Santa Fe
Club Blooming managers